Abaga is the name of several rural localities in the Sakha Republic, Russia:
Abaga, Amginsky District, Sakha Republic, a selo in Abaginsky Rural Okrug of Amginsky District; 
Abaga, Olyokminsky District, Sakha Republic, a selo in Abaginsky Rural Okrug of Olyokminsky District;

See also
Abaga tsentralnaya, a selo in Abaginsky Rural Okrug of Olyokminsky District